The Diocese of Pavia is a see of the Catholic Church in Italy. It has been a suffragan of the Archdiocese of Milan only since 1817. Previous to the reorganization of the hierarchy in northern Italy by Pope Pius VII after the expulsion of the French and the Congress of Vienna, the diocese of Pavia had depended directly upon the Holy See, despite repeated failed attempts on the part of the Archbishops of Milan to claim control. The diocese has produced one Pope and Patriarch of Venice, and three cardinals.

The seat of the bishop is the Cattedrale di Maria Assunta e S. Stefano Protomartire in Pavia. The current bishop of Pavia is Corrado Sanguineti, appointed by Pope Francis on 1 December 2015.

History

Pavia was the capital of the Lombard Kingdom of Italy (from 570) and of their successors, the Holy Roman Emperors as Kings of Italy. There was a royal palace in Pavia, which saw frequent visits from the Emperors.

Pope Hormisdas (517–523) is said to have granted Bishop Ennodius and his successors as Bishops of Pavia the use of the pallium. This claim has, however, been challenged. Pope John VIII also granted the Bishops of Pavia the same privilege in a letter of 24 August 877.

In the last week of June 743, Pope Zacharias (741–752) visited Pavia and solemnly celebrated the Feast of S. Peter at the monastery of S. Pietro in Ciel d'oro.

Bishop Joannes (II) (874–911 ?) signed the confirmation of the accession of Charles the Bald and took the oath of allegiance in February 876.

Pope John VIII held a synod at Pavia in December 878, as he was returning to Rome from his trip to France.

In 885, Pope Stephen V (885–891) granted the Bishop of Pavia the duchy of Comacchio.

A synod met in Pavia in 889 to ratify the selection of Guido of Spoleto as King of Italy, and to swear feudal allegiance. A council was held at Pavia in 933 to expel Bishop Ratherius of Verona from his diocese for three years, because of his opposition to Hugh of Arles, King of Italy. He was restored by a synod under orders from Pope John XII.

On 2 April 987, Bishop Guido and the Canons of the Cathedral received a rebuke from Pope John XV because they had been harassing the monastery of S. Pietro in Ciel d'oro.

In 997, Pope Gregory V (Bruno of Carinthia) held a synod in Pavia. He had been expelled from Rome shortly after the Coronation of the Emperor Otto III, his cousin, who had procured his election to the papal throne at the request of the Romans themselves. Shortly after his coronation, Otto condemned and expelled from Rome the former dictator of the City, Crescentius of Nomentum. As soon as Otto left the city, Crescentius returned and drove out Pope Gregory, who fled to Pavia. At the synod of Pavia, the rule against making agreements about a future pope during the lifetime of the present pope was reenacted, as were rules against simony. Crescentius was excommunicated, and, on the Pope's return to Rome, was beheaded in the Castel S. Angelo.

On 15 April 1123, Pope Calixtus II confirmed all the privileges belonging to the Church of Pavia, and issued a ruling that, at Roman synods, the Bishop of Pavia should hold the first seat on the left of the pope, perpetualiter.

Bishop Pietro Toscani (1148–1180) was deprived of his episcopal cross and his pallium by Pope Alexander III in 1175 or 1176, because of his support for the Antipope Victor IV and the excommunicated Frederick Barbarossa. Frederick continued to protect him, however, even though the city of Pavia joined the Lombard League. After the Lombard League triumphed over Frederick at the Battle of Legnano, the Bishop's position became precarious. When Alexander reached an agreement with Frederick at their conference at Venice, Bishop Pietro was among those forgiven for their crimes.

The Studium Generale (University) of Pavia was founded on 13 April 1361 by a diploma of the Emperor Charles IV, at the request of Galeazzo Visconti of Milan. The University Library was established in 1754 by order of the Empress Maria Theresa, who refounded the entire university which had fallen into a long decadence. In 1867 the University had 926 students.

On 15 February 1743, by an Apostolic Brief of Pope Benedict XIV, the diocese of Pavia was united with the metropolitan diocese of Amaseia (Hellespont, Turkey). Thereafter the Bishop of Pavia was also an Archbishop.

Cathedral and Chapter
In 816, the Emperor Louis the Pious held a council at Aix, at which it was ordered that Canons and Canonesses live together according to a set of rules (canons, regulae). In the Roman synod of Pope Eugene II of November 826, it was ordered that Canons live together in a cloister next to the church. In 876, the Council of Pavia decreed in Canon X that the bishops should enclose the Canons: uti episcopi in civitatibus suis proximum ecclesiae claustrum instituant, in quo ipsi cum clero secundum canonicam regulam Deo militent, et sacerdotes suos ad hoc constringant, ut ecclesiam non relinquant et alibi habitare praesumant.

The Cathedral Chapter, in 1571, consisted of four dignities (the Provost, the Archdeacon, the Archpriest, and the Cantor) and twelve Canons. On 29 February 1572, Bishop Ippolito Rossi (1564–1591), acting in accordance with the Bull In Eminenti of Pope Pius IV of 30 May 1571, suppressed the Collegiate Church of Santa Maria in Pertica in the city of Pavia, and transferred its Provost and seven Canons to the Cathedral Chapter. The title of the Provost of Santa Maria was changed to that of Dean of the Cathedral Chapter, which thereafter had five dignities and nineteen Canons. In 1672 there were five dignities and sixteen Canons. On 25 April 1577 Bishop Rossi also provided new regulations for the College of Chaplains in the cathedral. That college was led by a prior, mansionarii, and a curate.

In 1110, Bishop Guido (1103–1118) granted the Cathedral Chapter of Pavia the right to the decima in the city of Pavia and for eight miles round about. This grant was confirmed by Bishop Petrus Spelta (1343–1356) on 4 November 1350.

On 4 December 1341, Canon Mascarino Tacconi, Vicar General of Bishop Giovanni Fulgesi (1328–1342), issued Statutes for the Cathedral Chapter of Pavia. On 7 January and 29 March 1342, two canons swore to observe the statutes issued by the Bishop's vicar. The canons, however, became more and more lax, until the Franciscan bishop Guilelmus (1386–1402) issued a warning on 12 January 1387 concerning certain duties which they were expected to perform, including the obligation to say Mass in the cathedral; the Bishop's warning included penalties for failing to comply. On 7 March, the chapter passed on the warnings to the chaplains of the cathedral, with extensive instructions.

On 3 September 1484, the cathedral chapter on its own initiative compiled a new edition of the statutes of the cathedral chapter. On 9 August 1507 Canon Vincenzo Beccaria, the Vicar General of the bishop Cardinal Francesco Alidosio (who was absent, serving as papal legate in Bologna), issued statutes for the canons and chaplains of the cathedral. The canons themselves issued more specific regulations regarding residence and the performance of choir duties on 21 January 1518; these were confirmed on 6 February by Canon Girolamo della Porta, the Vicar General of Cardinal Antonio Ciocchi del Monte, who was not residential.

Diocesan synods

A meeting, sometimes called a synodus, was held in Pavia by the Emperor Louis II, the son of Lothair I. It was also called the Conventus Ticinensis, and was presided over by Archbishop Angilbertus of Milan, the Patriarch Theodemar of Aquileia, and Bishop Joseph the Archchaplain. Twenty-four canons regarding ecclesiastical discipline were agreed upon, and five chapters concerning political matters. Immediately thereafter, the Emperor visited Rome, where he was crowned emperor by Pope Leo IV. He held two other meetings in Pavia, with the same high ecclesiastical vassals presiding, one in February 855 and the other in July 855.

Bishop Guido Langasco (1295–1311) held a diocesan synod in 1297.

A diocesan synod was held in the Cathedral Chapter house in Pavia on 16 February 1317, during the Administratorship of Giovanni Beccaria, O.Min. (1320–1324), Latin Patriarch of Antioch (Syria). The Patriarch was not present, but was rather serving at the Papal Court in Avignon, dicto domino patriarcha administratore apud sedem apostolicam existente. The synod was therefore presided over by the Patriarch's two Vicars, the Archdeacon Bonifazio de Frascarolo and Zonfredus de Castana Canon of Monza. The decisions of the synod had mostly to do with legal matters, oaths, thieves, punishments, and with the collection of the decima. Bishop Giovanni Fulgesi (1328–1342) held another synod c. 1343, with exhortations and regulations concerning the seven sacraments, burials, the preaching of indulgences, and the decima and clerical debtors.

In 1518 a diocesan synod was held, though the Administrator of the diocese, Cardinal Antonio Maria Ciocchi del Monte (1511–1521) did not attend. He did send a letter of thanks to his Vicar, Giovanni Luchini Curzio, who presided and gave the opening address. Among other matters, the synod legislated on the sons of priests, the cohabitation of clerics and women, and clerical non-residence (the clergy of the Cathedral being exempted).  A diocesan synod was held by Cardinal Ippolito Rossi (1564–1591) on 14 November 1566.

On 19 July 1576, the Apostolic Visitor by the mandate of Pope Gregory XIII, Bishop Angelo Peruzzi, Auxiliary Bishop of Bologna and titular bishop of Caesarea, issued a set of decrees for the diocese of Pavia in thirty-eight chapters, on the same themes as appear regularly in diocesan statutes. These statutes, however, took account of the various decrees of the recently concluded Council of Trent. Bishop Peruzzi had previously conducted a visitation of the diocese of Modena to the satisfaction of the Pope, who then assigned him to do the same at Pavia, Piacenza, and Parma.

Bishop Giovanni Battista Biglia (1609–1617) held a synod in 1612. A synod was held by Bishop Francesco Biglia (1648–1659) in 1652.

Bishop Agostino Gaetano Riboldi (1877–1901) held a diocesan synod in Pavia on 10–12 September 1878, and had the decrees of the synod published.

The diocese's 100 parishes are all located in the (civil) region Lombardy: 97 in the Province of Pavia and 2 in the Province of Milan. There is one priest for every 1291 Catholics.

Bishops of Pavia

To 1000

Syrus (283–339)
Pompeius of Pavia (339–353)
Juventius of Pavia, also Eventius, Iventius, Inventius (353–392)
Profuturus (397–c. 401)
Obedianus
Urciscenus (410–433)
Crispinus (433–466)
Epiphanius of Pavia (466–499)
Maximus of Pavia (499–514)
Magnus Felix Ennodius (514–521)
Crispinus (II) (521 ? – 541)
Paulus (c. 541 – c. 566)
Pompeius
Severus
Anastasius (ca. 658 – 680)
Damianus (680–710)
Armentarius (710–722)
Petrus (722–736)
Theodore of Pavia (ca. 740 – 778)
Hieronymus (778–791)
Abbot Ubaldus, O.S.B. (791–805 ?) Administrator
Joannes (I) (813–826)
Sebastianus
Deodatus (Donumdei) (c. 830 – 840)
Liutardus (Liutprandus)
Liutfredus (864–874)
Joannes (II) (874–911 ?)
Joannes (III) (912-924)
Leo (924–929)
...Two doubtful names follow Leo: a Saint Innocenzo and a Sigifredo. 
Liudfridus (c. 939–967)
Pietro Canepanova (971–983)
Guido (c. 987 – 1007)

1000 to 1500

Uberto (1008–1009 ?)
Rainaldus (1014–1046)
Udalricus (Adalricus) (c. 1055/1057 – 1066/1067)
Guilelmus (c. 1068 – 1102/1103)
Guido (1103–1118)
Bernardus (c. 1119 – 1130)
Pietro (Rosso or Rossi) (1130–1139)
Alfano 
Pietro Toscani, O.Cist. (1148–1180)
Lanfranco Beccari (1180–1198)
Bernardo Balbi (1198–1213)
Rodobaldo de'Sangiorgio (1213–1215)
Gregorio Crescenzi (1215–1216)
Fulco Scotti (1217–1229)
Rodobaldo Cepolla (1230–1254)
Guglielmo Caneti (c. 1256–1272)
Conradus Beccaria (1272–1282)
Guido Tacio (Zazzi), O.S.B. (1272–1294)
Otto Beccaria (1294–1295)
Guido Langasco (1295–1311)
Isnardus Tacconi, O.P. (1311–1320)
Giovanni Beccaria, O.Min. (1320–1324) Administrator
Carantus Sannazaro (1326–1328)
Giovanni Fulgesi (1328–1342)
Cardinal Gaucelmo Deuza (1342) Administrator
Matteo Ribaldi (1342–1343)
Petrus Spelta, O.Humil. (1343–1356)
Alcherius de Montilio (1356–c.1362)
Franciscus Sottoriva (1363–1386)
Guilelmus, O.Min. (1386–1402)
Pietro Grassi (1402–1426)
Francesco Piccolopasso (1427–1435)
Enrico Rampini (1435–1446)
Giacomo Borromeo (1446–1453)
Giovanni Castiglione (1453–1460)
Giacomo Piccolomini-Ammanati (1460–1479)
Sede vacante
Ascanio Sforza (1479–1505) Administrator

Since 1500

Francesco Alidosius (1505–1511)
Antonio Maria Ciocchi del Monte (1511–1521) Administrator 
Giovanni Maria Ciocchi del Monte (1521–1530), later Pope Julius III
Giovanni Girolamo Rossi (1530–1541)
Giovanni Maria Ciocchi del Monte (1544–1550)
Giovanni Girolamo Rossi (1550–1564)z
Ippolito de' Rossi (1564–1591)
Alexander Sauli, B. (1591–1592)
Francesco Gonzaga, O.Min.Obs. (1593)
Guglielmo Bastoni (1593–1609)
Giovanni Battista Biglia (1609–1617)
Fabrizio Landriani (1617–1642)
Giovanni Battista Sfondrati (1642–1647)
Francesco Biglia (1648–1659)
Girolamo Melzi (1659–1672)
Lorenzo Trotti (1672–1700)
Cardinal Giacomo Antonio Morigia (1701–1711)
Agostino Cusani (1711–1724)
Francesco Pertusati, O.S.B. (1724–1752)
Carlo Durini (1753–1769)
Bartolomeo Olivazzi (1769–1792)
Giuseppe Bertieri (1792–1804)
Sede vacante (1804–1807)
Paolo Lamberto D'Allègre (1807–1821)
Luigi Tosi (1823–1845)
Sede vacante (1845–1850)
Angelo Ramazzotti (1850–1858)
Pietro Maria Ferré (1860–1867)
Sede vacante (1867–1871)
Lucido Maria Parocchi (1871–1877)
Agostino Gaetano Riboldi (1877–1901)
Francesco Ciceri (1901–1924)
Giuseppe Ballerini (1924–1933)
Giovanni Battista Girardi (1934–1942)
Carlo Allorio (1942–1968)
Antonio Giuseppe Angioni (1968–1986)
Giovanni Volta (1986–2003)
Giovanni Giudici (2003–2015)
Corrado Sanguineti (2015–present)

See also
 Timeline of Pavia
 Boethius

Notes

References

Books

Books in Italian

 
 
 
Bullough, D. A. (1969). "I vescovi di Pavia nei secoli ottavo e nono: fonti e cronologia," in: Pavia capitale del regno, pp. 317–328.
Caprioli, Adriano; Antonio Rimoldi; Luciano Vaccaro (edd.) (1995). La diocesi di Pavia. Storia Religiosa di Lombardia, 11.  Brescia: La Scuola.

 
 Pavia capitale del regno: Atti del 4o Congresso internazionale di studi sull'alto medioevo (Pavia-Scaldasole-Monza-Bobbio, 10–14 settembre 1967).'' Spoleto: Centro Italiano di Studi sull'Alto Medioevo, 1969.

Books in Latin

 
 

Hierarchia catholica

External links
Official site
Catholic-Hierarchy
GCatholic.org

Pavia
 
Province of Pavia